James Donald Ragland (November 12, 1940 – May 16, 2006) was an American football player and coach. He served as the head coach at Tennessee Technological University from 1986 to 1995, compiling a record of 42–66.

Head coaching record

References

External links
 

1940 births
2006 deaths
American football quarterbacks
Ole Miss Rebels football players
Memphis Tigers football coaches
Tampa Spartans football coaches
Tennessee Tech Golden Eagles football coaches
Texas Tech Red Raiders football coaches
West Virginia Mountaineers football coaches
People from Cookeville, Tennessee